"Better Be Home Soon" is a song written by Neil Finn and performed by rock band Crowded House. It appears on their second studio album, Temple of Low Men, which was later released in July 1988. The song was issued as a single in June 1988 by Capitol Records, peaking at number two on the Australian and New Zealand charts and reaching number 42 on the US Billboard Hot 100. In 2001, the song was voted by members of Australasian Performing Right Association (APRA) as the 33rd-best New Zealand song of the 20th century. In 2005, following drummer Paul Hester's death, Finn performed the song solo at the ARIA Awards while a montage of Hester's life was played in the background.

Music video
Nick Seymour attempted to explain the concept of the video in a 1988 issue of Smash Hits. He likened it to the INXS video he worked on for Listen Like Thieves: "only theirs was sort of macho." He called it a fun video with the Dickensian style clothes people were wearing. Seymour says it this way: "Basically a film clip just makes people see things that the song's not really about. This song is definitely not about being in a theatre stuck out in the desert! It's about being home, how it's better being home. The reason Seymour played the double bass for the video was because "it just looks better".

Notable performances
"Better Be Home Soon" was performed by Crowded House in their 1996 charity performance Farewell to the World. As a song commonly performed by the band, this was to be expected, however the end of this version featured a country or polka style double-time feeling at the end, possibly in joking retort to some criticisms of the song when initially released that it was a bit "country-ish". They also performed it as an encore at the Sydney Live Earth concert. At the 2005 ARIA Awards program, Neil Finn performed the song as a memorial to Paul Hester. It was performed as part of their setlist at the 2022 Glastonbury Festival.

Track listings
All songs were written by Neil Finn. All tracks from the album Temple of Low Men except "Don't Dream It's Over" were recorded at The Roxy, Los Angeles, on 26 February 1987.

'UK 7-inch and US cassette single
 "Better Be Home Soon" - 3:08
 "Kill Eye" - 3:12

UK 12-inch and CD single
 "Better Be Home Soon" - 3:08
 "Kill Eye" - 3:12
 "Don't Dream It's Over" - 5:55 (live)
 "Better Be Home Soon" - 3:08

Charts

Weekly charts

Year-end charts

Cover versions
 The McCarters (peaked at number 73 on the Billboard Hot Country Singles & Tracks chart in 1990)
 George Canyon (peaked at number 87 on the Billboard Canadian Hot 100 in January 2011)

References

1988 singles
1988 songs
ARIA Award-winning songs
Capitol Records singles
Crowded House songs
George Canyon songs
The McCarters songs
Song recordings produced by Mitchell Froom
Songs written by Neil Finn